The Jim Henson Company Lot, formerly A&M Studios, is a studio property located just south of the southeast corner of North La Brea Avenue and Sunset Boulevard in Hollywood. Originally established by film star Charlie Chaplin, the property served as Charlie Chaplin Studios from 1917 to 1953, which later earned the site designation as a Los Angeles Historic-Cultural Monument. After being sold by Chaplin in 1953, the property went through several changes in ownership and has served at various times as Kling Studios, the Red Skelton Studios, the shooting location for the Adventures of Superman and Perry Mason television series. From 1966 to 1999, it was the headquarters for A&M Records and the location of A&M Recording Studios. Since 2000, it has been the headquarters of The Jim Henson Company, including the Henson Soundstage and Henson Recording Studios.

History

Construction 
In October 1917, Charlie Chaplin announced plans to build his own film studio at the southeast corner of La Brea and Sunset Boulevard. In his autobiography, Chaplin described the decision as follows:

At the end of the Mutual contract, I was anxious to get started with First National, but we had no studio. I decided to buy land in Hollywood and build one. The site was the corner of Sunset and La Brea and had a very fine ten-room house and five acres of lemon, orange and peach trees. We built a perfect unit, complete with developing plant, cutting room, and offices.

Chaplin purchased the site from R.S. McClellan, who lived on the site and had a large grove of orange trees on the property. Chaplin announced he would make his home on the northern part of the property, and build his own motion picture plant on the south part of the property, cornering at La Brea and De Longpre. Chaplin's plans for six English-style buildings, "arranged as to give the effect of a picturesque English village street," were published in the Los Angeles Times in October 1917. The plans were prepared by the Milwaukee Building Company (Meyer & Holler), and the total investment was estimated to be in the region of $100,000. The layout of the buildings was described by the Los Angeles Times in 2002 as a "fairy-tale cottage complex." Another writer has described the style as "eccentric Peter Pan architecture."

The location was at that time a residential neighborhood, and Chaplin's application for a building permit was opposed by area residents, some of whom complained that it was too near the Hollywood High School.  However, the City Council voted 8–1 to approve Chaplin's permit.  Chaplin reportedly built his "English cottage-style studio" in three months beginning in November 1917, at a reported cost of only $35,000.  The DVD collection titled "Chaplin Collection" includes Chaplin's 1918 film How to Make Movies, which depicts the studio's construction in time-lapse photography.

Construction of the studios was completed in approximately 1919. Chaplin preserved a large existing residence on the northern (Sunset Boulevard) end of the property, and planned to live there, but never in fact did. Various studio personnel lived there over the years, including his brother Sydney Chaplin. The "English cottages" along La Brea served as the facade for offices, a screening room, and a film laboratory.  The grounds included stables, a swimming pool and tennis courts.  The central part of the property, which was originally an orchard, became the backlot, where large outdoor sets were constructed. The two large open-air stages used for filming were constructed on the southern end of the property, and the rest of the facility consisted of dressing rooms, a garage, a carpenter's shed, and a film vault.

Charlie Chaplin (1919–1952) 

Many of Chaplin's classic films were shot at the studios, including The Kid (1921), The Gold Rush (1925), City Lights (1931), Modern Times (1936), The Great Dictator (1940), Monsieur Verdoux (1947), and Limelight (1952). Chaplin also filmed many famous visitors at his studios on La Brea, including Winston Churchill, Helen Keller, Lord Mountbatten, and Harry Lauder.

The studios saw a number of changes over the next 20 years. The two open-air stages were converted to closed soundstages in the mid-1930s, before the filming of Modern Times, and a smaller stage was also built over the site of the studio swimming pool at that time.  Stage 2 had previously been seriously damaged by a fire during production of The Circus in 1927.  Also, the expansion of La Brea Avenue in 1928–29 forced the physical movement of the buildings adjacent to the street back  from their original locations, causing some disruption to the filming of City Lights.

In 1942, Chaplin sold the northern portion of the property, the portion containing the residence, tennis courts, and a portion of his backlot, to Safeway Stores.  The house was demolished, and a shopping center was built in its place.

In October 1943, Chaplin's studios were opened up for the first time to be used to shoot an outside production, My Client Curly, released as Once Upon a Time (1944), produced by Columbia Pictures.  The Los Angeles Times reported at the time that the Chaplin Studio "has been more or less sacrosanct, in the sense that outsiders were practically never permitted to work there."  However, studio manager Alfred Reeves told the Times that the Chaplin organization was "not going into the space rental business," and that the use of the studios by Columbia would not create a precedent.

In 1949, the studios were reportedly the site of Greta Garbo's last screen test.

Television production (1953–1966) 
Chaplin left the US in October 1952 amid political persecution, and sold the studio the following year to Webb and Knapp for $650,000. The new owner had planned to tear down the studio, but it was quickly leased to a television production company and became known as Kling Studios. In 1955, it was used to shoot the Adventures of Superman television series starring George Reeves.

Beginning in 1959, Red Skelton shot his television series at the facility, and in April 1960 Skelton purchased the studio.  From behind a desk in the office once occupied by Chaplin, Skelton said:

I'm not the head of the studio.  I'll be president and just own the joint. ... Seriously, I couldn't be a studio executive because I'm not qualified. ... I've got a nice enough racket trying to make people laugh and don't intend to foul that up.  And, besides, that's harder than running a studio.

Skelton purchased three large mobile units for taping color television shows, making a total investment estimated at $3.5 million.  Skelton had a large "Skelton Studios" sign erected over the main gate on La Brea Avenue.  Skelton also removed a block of sidewalk on the studio grounds into which Chaplin had signed and pressed his footprints on January 21, 1918, for display at his Palm Springs home.  After Skelton's death in 1997, the block was donated to the Skelton Museum collection at Vincennes University.

Skelton sold the studio to CBS in 1962, and CBS shot the Perry Mason television series there from 1962 to 1966.

A&M Records (1967–1999) 

In 1966, Herb Alpert and Jerry Moss purchased Chaplin's studio from CBS to serve as a headquarters for A&M Records. A&M Records had grown from $500,000 in revenues in 1964 to $30 million in 1967. Alpert and Moss reportedly "astonished the big network by having their bank deliver a cashier's check for more than $1 million, the full amount."  A&M converted two of the old soundstages and Chaplin's swimming pool into a recording studio.  A 1968 profile on Alpert and Moss described their renovation of Chaplin's old studios: "The old sound stages are in the process of being completely rebuilt into what must be the most luxurious and pleasant recording studios in the world. Chaplin's cement footprints are one of the few reminders of the past.

In February 1969, the studios were designated as a Los Angeles Historic-Cultural Monument.  At the time, Carl Dentzel, the President of the Los Angeles Cultural Heritage Board, said the property was one of the few locations from old Hollywood that retained a complete early-day production layout. Dentzel also noted, Chaplin's "studio was one of the first to be established here and by some quirk of fate continuity from the movies' earliest times to today's television and recordings demands has persevered."  The studio was only the second entertainment-related building to receive the Historic-Cultural Monument designation after Grauman's Chinese Theatre.

The elderly Chaplin briefly revisited his former studio in April 1972, when he made his only return trip to America to accept an honorary Academy Award. A&M had hoped to welcome him back with a ceremony, but instead he chose to avoid the attention and arranged to drive by the studio gates on a weekend. In April 1989, the organization "Hollywood Heritage" celebrated the 100th anniversary of Chaplin's birth with a rare screening of Chaplin's 1918 documentary How to Make Movies and The Kid, both shown at the Chaplin Stage at A&M Records. Chaplin's son, Sydney, received a plaque at the screening honoring his father's achievements. For the 1992 biopic Chaplin, an exterior set of the studio office buildings was constructed among the orange groves north of Los Angeles at Fillmore, Route 126 between Ventura and Valencia. The actual studio is shown near the end of the film, where Chaplin's limousine is depicted stopping at the gates in 1972.

The Jim Henson Company (2000–present) 

In February 2000, Jim Henson's children purchased the studio for $12.5 million to serve as the new home of The Jim Henson Company.

Henson's daughter, Lisa Henson, said, "The buildings are a lovable hodge-podge of quirky, unusual spaces.  There are unexpected elements in some of the offices like original vaults and fish tank-like bathrooms. It's not your typical corporate space, but it's ideal for the Muppets." At a ceremony in June 2000, the Henson Company unveiled a  color statue of Kermit the Frog, dressed as Chaplin's character The Tramp, above the studio's main gate. Henson's son, Brian Henson, said at the time, "When we heard that the Chaplin lot was for sale, we had to have it. It's the perfect home for the Muppets and our particular brand of classy, but eccentric entertainment. When people walk onto our lot, they fall in love with Hollywood again."

In 2007, the Sci-Fi Channel series Ghost Hunters shot an episode at the studios, reporting on ghost stories told for years by employees working on the lot.

The lot was used as the set for the abandoned Muppet Studios in the 2011 film The Muppets.

Facilities

Henson Recording Studios 
Henson Recording Studios (formerly A&M Studios) is a recording studio located on the lot. It consists of four studio suites and a mixing suite.

Many notable recording artists have recorded songs, albums and videos at the studios, including Styx, Toto, the Carpenters, the Police, the Moody Blues, Oingo Boingo, David Lee Roth, Soundgarden, Take That, Van Morrison, Lindsay Lohan and Westlife. Joni Mitchell was a frequent client, recording 13 of her 19 studio albums at the studios (then still called A&M Studios).

In 1985, the hit single and video "We Are the World" was recorded in Studio A by a cast that included Michael Jackson, Bob Dylan, Kenny Rogers, Stevie Wonder and Bruce Springsteen, among many others. On February 1, 2010, the song was re-recorded there to benefit victims of the Haiti earthquake.

In 2011, Van Halen's comeback album, A Different Kind of Truth, was recorded in Studio C with producer John Shanks. On February 1, 2012, they performed live at Henson Studios to a celebrity-packed crowd, adding to the performance legend of the studio.

Henson Recording Studios was also one of the places where punk rock band the Offspring recorded their ninth studio album, Days Go By (2012), with producer Bob Rock.

Alice in Chains recorded three albums at the studios: 2009's Black Gives Way To Blue, 2013's The Devil Put Dinosaurs Here and 2018's Rainier Fog.

Seether also recorded their 2014 album Isolate and Medicate at Henson Recording Studios.

John Mayer recorded his 2021 album Sob Rock at the studios and filmed a performance video for a ballad arrangement of his song "Last Train Home" there.

Henson Soundstage 
The Henson Soundstage (formerly Chaplin Stage) is a sound stage on the lot.

During A&M's tenure, it was used to film music videos, including "Every Breath You Take" by the Police and "Ghostbusters" by Ray Parker Jr. In addition, Soul Train was taped there from 1981 to 1985.

See also 
 Los Angeles Historic-Cultural Monuments in Hollywood

References

External links 

 Official Jim Henson Lot Leasing website
 Henson Recording Studios
  A&M Studios history and photos of all rooms with equipment and recordings made, mixed and or mastered at A&M
 Seeing Stars.com: Chaplin Studios
 Big Orange Landmarks Blog: A&M Records Studios (Original Charlie Chaplin Studios) — with vintage & contemporary photos.

The Jim Henson Company subsidiaries
Television studios in the United States
Henson Company Lot
Backlot sets
Henson Company Lot
Los Angeles Historic-Cultural Monuments
Buildings and structures completed in 1917
1917 establishments in California
Culture of Hollywood, Los Angeles
Henson Company Lot
Henson Company Lot